The 1965–66 UCLA Bruins men's basketball team finished the season in second place, under head coach John R. Wooden. It won the Los Angeles Classic Championship and completed the year with an 18–8 overall record.

Preseason
The 1965–1966 UCLA Bruin team was the ranked No. 1 in preseason polls. On November 27, 1965, the freshmen team, led by Lew Alcindor, defeated the varsity team 75–60 in the first game in the new Pauley Pavilion. Alcindor scored 31 points and had 21 rebounds in that game although the defeat had no effect on the varsity's national ranking. The Bruins were still number one the following week.

Roster

Schedule

|-
!colspan=9 style=|Regular Season

Source

Rankings

See also
 1966 NCAA Men's Division I Basketball Tournament

Notes
 The team beat USC four times, winning 94–79 at home and 99–62 away the last two games.
 The Bruins lost to Duke twice.

Team players drafted into the NBA

References 

Ucla Bruins
UCLA Bruins men's basketball seasons
UCLA Bruins
UCLA Bruins